Landrith is a surname. Notable people with the surname include:

George Landrith (born 1960), American lawyer and political activist
Hobie Landrith (born 1930), American baseball player
Ira Landrith (1865–1941), American Presbyterian minister and temperance activist

See also
Landreth (disambiguation)